Hypsoblennius paytensis is a species of combtooth blenny found in the eastern Pacific Ocean, from Costa Rica to Peru.

References

paytensis
Fish described in 1876